Sir John Wyborne was an English governor of Bombay during the period of the Honourable East India Company. He assumed the office in 1686 and left office on 4 February 1690.

A friend of Samuel Pepys, he was sent to India by the East India Company to deal with piracy.

Notes

Year of birth missing
Year of death missing
Governors of Bombay
Deputy Governors of Bombay